The 2005–2006 session  was a session of the California State Legislature.

Major legislation

Enacted
SB 1613  - Law banning the use of cell phones in cars.

Senate

  Democrats: 25
  Republicans: 15

The party affiliation and district numbers of Senators are listed after their names in this list.

President Pro Tem: Don Perata (D-9)
Majority Leader: Gloria Romero (D-24)
Minority Leader: Dick Ackerman (R-33)

* Tom Harman won the June 6, 2006 special election (and was sworn in on June 12, 2006) for the 35th Senate District seat to replace John Campbell, who vacated his State Senate seat on December 7, 2005 to become a member of the United States House of Representatives.

Assembly

Officers
Speaker Fabian Núñez (D-46)
Speaker pro Tempore Leland Yee, Ph.D. (D-12)
Assistant Speaker pro Tempore Sally J. Lieber (D-22)
Majority Floor Leader Dario Frommer (D-43)
Minority Floor Leader Michael Villines (R-29) from November 10, 2006
George A. Plescia (R-75) from April 17, 2006 to November 10, 2006
Kevin McCarthy (R-32) to April 17, 2006
Chief Clerk E. Dotson Wilson
Sergeant at Arms Ronald Pane
Note: The Chief Clerk and the Sergeant at Arms are not Members of the Legislature

Full List of Members, 2005-2006

* Ted Lieu won the September 13, 2005 special election (and was sworn in on September 21, 2005) for the 53rd Assembly District seat to replace Mike Gordon, who died on June 25, 2005, due to a brain tumor.
* Assemblyman Tom Harman won the June 6, 2006 special election for the 35th District seat in the California State Senate and resigned from the Assembly (and was sworn into the Senate) on June 12, 2006. He would have been term limited at the end of 2006.

See also
 List of California state legislatures

2005-2006
Legislature
Legislature
California
California